Emmanuel Goldstein is a key character in George Orwell's novel Nineteen Eighty-Four.

Emmanuel Goldstein may also refer to:

Emmanuel Goldstein, pen name of Eric Corley, editor of the hacker magazine 2600: The Hacker Quarterly
Emmanuel Goldstein alias Cereal Killer, fictional character in the 1995 film Hackers